Le Roi David was composed in Mézières, Switzerland, in 1921 by Arthur Honegger, as incidental music for a play in French by René Morax. It was called dramatic psalm, but has also been performed as oratorio, without staging. The plot, based on biblical narration, tells the story of King David, first a shepherd boy, his victories in battle, relationship to Saul, rise to power, adultery, mourning of his son's death, and finally his own death. The work has 27 musical movements consisting of voice solos, choruses, and instrumental interludes. A narrator unifies the work by providing spoken narration of the story of King David. 

Arthur Honegger was commissioned to write incidental music to accompany René Morax's play Le Roi David in 1921. The commission outlined that the work was to be performed by 100 singers and seventeen instruments. Honegger struggled with these limited resources, and wrote to Igor Stravinsky for advice.  Stravinsky advised him to think as if he had purposefully chosen that instrumentation, and compose as such.  Honegger had a nearly impossible deadline of 2 months to complete the work. This short deadline made it necessary for him to write the movements of this 27 movement work out of order. First, he wrote the choral and solo voice parts to allow the music to be copied and rehearsed. Honegger wrote the orchestration for the entire work last. He completed his composition on May 20, 1921, and was rewarded with much acclaim at the premiere on June 11, 1921. In 1923 he combined Morax's narrative with his music and created a "symphonic psalm," the form that is familiar today, and titled his work Le Roi David.

Instrumentation

Original 1921 version: Honegger originally wrote his Le Roi David music for the forces that were available at Morax's Mézières village theatre group, creating a score for the resources available; a small ensemble of 16 musicians comprising: 2 flutes [1 doubling piccolo], 1 oboe [doubling cor anglais], 2 clarinets [1 doubling bass clarinet], 1 bassoon [doubling contrabassoon], 1 horn, 2 trumpets, 1 trombone, timpani, 1 percussionist (playing snare drum, bass drum, cymbals, tambourine, and  tam-tam), piano, harmonium, celesta and 1 double bass. It was premiered there on 11 June 1921.

In 1923, bolstered by the success of the original version, Honegger re-scored the work for a standard orchestra of 2 flutes [1 doubling piccolo], 2 oboes [1 doubling cor anglais], 2 clarinets [1 doubling bass clarinet], 2 bassoons [1 doubling contrabassoon], 4 horns, 2 trumpets, 3 trombones, tuba, timpani, snare drum, bass drum, cymbals, tambourine, tam-tam, organ, celesta, harp, and strings) accompanying a chorus (often singing antiphonally or in unison), soprano, alto, tenor, and boy soprano soloists, a narrator and an actress for nº 12 – Incantation Scene (Saul and the witch of Endor). The music is separated into 27 mostly brief sections and features many individual instruments.

Structure 
The work is structured in three parts, the movements numbered to 27 in the 1952 edition (28 in the first edition).

Plot
Le Roi David is divided into three main parts and tells the biblical story of King David.  In the first part, the Lord directs the prophet Samuel to choose Saul as the ruler of the people of Israel.  However, when Saul does not follow the Lord's instructions, Samuel is told to place David as ruler.  The first part continues to tell the story of David's battles against the Philistines as well as Saul's growing jealousy of David.   The second part covers David's crowning and unification of Israel.  The third and final part tells of David's lust for Bathsheba and his punishment for adultery.  In this final section of the piece, David flees Jerusalem, loses his power, manages to restore his position as king then offends God by censusing the people.  An epidemic disease afflicts Jerusalem, and David appoints his son Solomon to succeed him and then dies.  At the end of the piece an angel tells of Isaiah's prophecy of a flower blooming from David's stem.

Analysis of text and music
The most significant element of Le Roi David is the combination of different styles of music in one complete work.  Honegger uses compositional techniques ranging from Gregorian chant to Baroque to jazz.  Honegger's utilization of all of these concepts allowed him to make a serious contribution to the neoclassical era. The music is full of thematic gestures and is most often performed in French.  There is an English version by Edward Agate.

References

External links
 Texts and English language translations
 Michael Steinberg: The Symphony: A Listener's Guide Oxford University Press 1995
 Honegger / King David Gramophone 2014
 Robert S. Hines: Arthur Honegger's Three Versions of "King David" Choral Journal 2006

Compositions by Arthur Honegger
Oratorios
Compositions with a narrator
Psalm settings
Oratorios based on the Bible
Cultural depictions of David
Witch of Endor